Phillip Harriman (born February 1, 1955) is an American politician and political commentator. A Republican, Harriman served four terms in the Maine Senate from 1992 to 2000. He represented a portion of Cumberland County, including his residence in Yarmouth. He served on the Yarmouth Town Council from 1986 to 1991.

Harriman was born in Biddeford, Maine, on February 1, 1955. He attended Husson University and Bryn Mawr College. He is married and has three children.

Current work
Harriman is the co-owner and founder of Lebel & Harriman, a financial services company.  He, together with Ethan Strimling, serves as a columnist for the Portland Press Herald, and is frequently tapped as a political analyst on local television.

References

1955 births
Living people
Republican Party Maine state senators
Politicians from Biddeford, Maine
People from Yarmouth, Maine
Husson University alumni
Bryn Mawr College alumni
Maine city council members